Daniel Biksadský (born 5 August 1978) is a Slovak sprint canoer who competed in the mid-2000s. At the 2004 Summer Olympics in Athens, he was eliminated in the semifinals of both the C-2 500 m and C-2 1000 m events.

External links
Sports-Reference.com profile

1978 births
Canoeists at the 2004 Summer Olympics
Living people
Olympic canoeists of Slovakia
Slovak male canoeists